List of champions of the 1909 U.S. National Championships tennis tournament (now known as the US Open). The men's tournament was held from 17 August to 27 August on the outdoor grass courts at the Newport Casino in Newport, Rhode Island. The women's tournament was held from 21 June to 27 June on the outdoor grass courts at the Philadelphia Cricket Club in Philadelphia, Pennsylvania. It was the 29th U.S. National Championships and the second Grand Slam tournament of the three played that year.

Finals

Men's singles

 William Larned (USA) defeated  William Clothier  (USA) 6–1, 6–2, 5–7, 1–6, 6–1

Women's singles

 Hazel Hotchkiss (USA) defeated  Maud Barger-Wallach (USA) 6–0, 6–1

Men's doubles
 Fred Alexander (USA) /  Harold Hackett (USA) defeated  Maurice McLoughlin (USA) /  George Janes (USA) 6–4, 6–4, 6–0

Women's doubles
 Hazel Hotchkiss (USA) /   Edith Rotch  (USA) defeated  Dorothy Green (USA) /  Lois Moyes (CAN) 6–1, 6–1

Mixed doubles
 Hazel Hotchkiss (USA) /  Wallace F. Johnson (USA) defeated  Louise Hammond Raymond (USA) /  Raymond Little (USA) 6–2, 6–0

References

External links
Official US Open website

 
U.S. National Championships
U.S. National Championships (tennis) by year
U.S. National Championships
U.S. National Championships
U.S. National Championships
U.S. National Championships
U.S. National Championships